Nathan Keonaona Chai is an American novelist known for having written Fire Creek (2005), which was turned into the film Fire Creek, for which he also wrote the screenplay.

Chai was raised in Salt Lake City, Utah. He studied at Brigham Young University (BYU), receiving both a bachelor's degree in then a masters in English with an emphasis in creative writing. He also worked as an editorial intern with BYU Magazine.

Chai currently teaches English at BYU. He has written several short stories, one of which was published in Dialogue: A Journal of Mormon Thought. In 2001 and 2002 Chai won honorable mention in the Stony Brook Short fiction contest.

Chai and his wife Mary live in Orem, Utah, with their two children.

References
Good Reads entry on Chai
Stony Brook Short fiction prize winners list

Latter Day Saints from Utah
Writers from Salt Lake City
Brigham Young University alumni
21st-century American novelists
21st-century American short story writers
American male screenwriters
Brigham Young University faculty
Living people
People from Orem, Utah
American male novelists
American male short story writers
Novelists from Utah
Screenwriters from Utah
Year of birth missing (living people)
21st-century American male writers